Camillus Costanzo SJ (Bovalino Superiore, 1571 – Hirado, Japan 15 September 1622) was an Italian soldier, law student and Jesuit missionary in Japan.  When he was burned alive in 1622, he became a Roman Catholic martyr.

Missionary

The Jesuit Order sent Father Costanzo to China; but the Portuguese prevented his entrance into that country.

Instead, he went to Japan. He learned the Japanese language quickly; and he successfully encouraged converts in the region near the city of Sakai.

When all missionaries were banished from Japan, he went to Macau.

Despite the dangers involved in ignoring the Tokugawa shogunate's exclusionary laws (sakoku), he returned in 1621.  Disguised as a soldier, he managed to elude capture until April 24, 1622 when he was arrested on the island of Hirado off the western coast of Kyushu.

He was condemned to death and was burned alive on September 15, 1622.

Beatification
Father Costanzo was beatified by Pope Pius IX on May 7, 1867.

Notes

References
 Merrick, D. A. (1891). Saints of the Society of Jesus. New York: Benziger. 
 Tylenda, Joseph N. (1998). Jesuit Saints & Martyrs: Short Biographies of the Saints, Blessed, Venerables, and Servants of God of the Society of Jesus. Chicago: Jesuit Way. 	;

External links
 Society of Jesus web site:  Blessed Camillus Costanzo, Martyr of Japan

1571 births
1622 deaths
17th-century Roman Catholic martyrs
16th-century Italian Jesuits
17th-century Italian Jesuits
Jesuit martyrs
Jesuit missionaries in Japan
Italian soldiers
Italian Roman Catholic missionaries
People executed by Japan by burning
Italian people executed abroad